Sinister is a death metal band from Schiedam, the Netherlands, formed in 1988.  They have released fourteen albums, most recently Deformation of the Holy Realm in 2020. 

The band was idle between 2003 and 2005, after which Aad Kloosterwaard, the only constant member, switched from drums to vocals.

Members

Current members
 Aad Kloosterwaard - vocals (2005–present), drums (1988–2003)
 Ghislain van der Stel - guitar (2017–present)
 Walter Bokito Tjwa - guitar (2019–present)
 Bram Willems - bass (2020-present)
 Simon Skrlec - drums (2022–present)

Former members 

 Mike (Sinister) van Mastrigt - vocals (1988–1996)
 Ron van de Polder - guitar, bass (1988–1992, 2003)
 Corzas Nanuruw - bass (1989–1991)
 Andre Tolhuizen - guitar (1991–1994)
 Frank Faaze - guitar (1991)
 Bart van Wallenberg - guitar, bass (1992–2002)
 Michel Alderliefsten - bass (1996)
 Eric de Windt - vocals (1997–1999)
 Alex Paul - bass (1997–2003), guitar (2005–2011) 
 Joost Silvrants - vocals (2000)
 Rachel Heyzer - vocals (2001–2003)
 Pascal Grevinga - guitar (2003)
 Paul Beltman - drums (2005–2008)
 Bas van den Bogaard - bass (2005–2011)
 Edwin van den Eeden -  drums (2008–2011)
 Dennis Hartog - guitar (2011 - 2020)
 Mathijs Brussaard - bass (2011 – 2015)
 Léon Caufijn - bass (2015–2016)
 Bastiaan Brussaard - guitar (2011 – 2017)
 Ricardo Falcon - guitar (2016–2018)
 Toep Duin - drums (2011–2022)

Timeline

Discography

Studio albums
Cross the Styx (1992)
Diabolical Summoning (1993)
Hate (1995)
Aggressive Measures (1998)
Creative Killings (2001)
Savage or Grace (2003)
Afterburner (2006)
The Silent Howling (2008)
Legacy of Ashes (2010)
The Carnage Ending (2012)
The Post-Apocalyptic Servant (2014)
Dark Memorials (2015) (covers album) 
Syncretism (2017)
Deformation of the Holy Realm (2020)

EPs and singles
Putrefying Remains/Spiritual Immolation (1990)
Sinister (1990)
Bastard Saints (1996)
The Unborn Dead (2014)
Gods of the Abyss (2017)

Music Videos
Leviathan (1993)
The Science of Prophecy (2014)Neurophobic (2017)

DVDsProphecies Denied'' (2006)

References

External links 

Dutch death metal musical groups
Musical groups established in 1988
Musical groups disestablished in 2004
Musical groups reestablished in 2005
Nuclear Blast artists
Musical quartets
Schiedam